The 1993 Virginia Slims of Philadelphia was a women's tennis tournament played on indoor carpet courts at the Philadelphia Civic Center in Philadelphia, Pennsylvania in the United States that was part of the Tier I category of the 1993 WTA Tour. It was the 11th edition of the tournament and was held from November 9 through November 14, 1993. Second-seeded Conchita Martínez won the singles title and earned $150,000 first-prize money.

Finals

Singles

 Conchita Martínez defeated  Steffi Graf 6–3, 6–3
 It was Martínez' 5th singles title of the year and the 16th of her career.

Doubles

 Katrina Adams /  Manon Bollegraf defeated  Conchita Martínez /  Larisa Savchenko 6–2, 4–6, 7–6(9–7)

References

External links
 ITF tournament edition details
 Tournament draws

Virginia Slims of Philadelphia
Advanta Championships of Philadelphia
Virginia Slims of Philadelphia
Virginia Slims of Philadelphia
Virginia Slims of Philadelphia